Cumby is a surname. Notable people with the surname include:

 Bert Cumby (1912–1981), American military intelligence officer
 George Cumby (born 1956), American football player
 William Pryce Cumby (1771–1837), British Royal Navy officer